The Felix M. Warburg House is a mansion located on 1109 Fifth Avenue and 92nd Street on the Upper East Side of Manhattan in New York City. The house was built from 1907 to 1908 for the German-American Jewish financier Felix M. Warburg and his family. After Warburg's death in 1937, his widow sold the mansion to a real estate developer. When plans to replace the mansion with luxury apartments fell through, the Warburgs donated it in 1944 to the Jewish Theological Seminary of America. In 1947, the Seminary opened the Jewish Museum of New York in the mansion. The house was named a New York City designated landmark in 1981 and was added to the National Register of Historic Places in 1982.

The mansion was designed in the Châteauesque style by C. P. H. Gilbert and retains its original façade, characterized by French Gothic details around the windows and on the roofline. In 1993, Kevin Roche constructed an annex to the house in Gilbert's style built with stone from the same quarry that supplied the original mansion, replacing an extension built in 1963. Critical reviews of the house's architecture have generally been positive with the exception of the 1963 extension.

History
In 1895, German Jewish banker Felix M. Warburg immigrated to the United States to marry Frieda Schiff, daughter of Jacob Schiff, head of the New York–based banking house Kuhn, Loeb & Co., which Warburg joined as a junior partner in 1897. After their honeymoon, the Warburgs moved into a townhouse at 18 East 72nd Street, a wedding gift to Frieda from her father. At the time, the surrounding section of Fifth Avenue was known as "Millionaires' Row" because of its wealthy residents.

Private residence
To build a new residence on their lot, the Warburgs selected architect C. P. H. Gilbert, who was at that time building a house for Felix's brother, Paul, and had impressed the family with the mansion he built for Isaac D. Fletcher on Fifth Avenue. In August 1907, Gilbert filed plans for the house, which was to cost $260,000. By the next month, workers were excavating the site, and Gilbert had hired Earr, Thaw & Fraser Co. to supply limestone for the mansion. In addition, A. J. Robinson & Co. had been hired as the building's general contractor, and Gilbert was responsible for interior finishes, including furniture. L. Alavoine & Co. and Messrs. William Baumgarten & Co. were awarded the contract for the house's interior decoration in May 1908.

The house was completed in 1908 and used just  of its Fifth Avenue frontage; the rest was used for a lawn. According to the 1910 United States census, Frieda and Felix Warburg lived in the house with their five children and 13 servants. The family hosted numerous events at their house. These included the wedding of their daughter Carola in 1916, which was attended by 900 guests; a "dramatic reading" to raise money for World War I relief in 1918; and a fundraiser for Jewish charities in 1928. Frieda took title to the house in January 1924.

On October 20, 1937, Felix Warburg died of a heart attack within the Warburg House. In his will, Felix had bequeathed his ownership stake in the Warburg House to Frieda. She remained in the mansion with a son and relatives who had fled Nazi Germany in the 1930s. The house continued to host events such as a meeting of the National Council for Jewish Women in 1938. Rising property tax as a consequence of nearby development greatly strained the Warburgs' finances; by 1941, the city government had appraised the property as being worth $665,000, of which the land was worth $625,000.

Frieda Warburg rented an apartment at 1070 Fifth Avenue in 1940. In May 1941, she sold the mansion to developer Henry Kaufman and architect Emery Roth, who intended to redevelop the site into an eighteen-story apartment building. The New York Herald Tribune reported that the house had been sold for less than $225,000. Roth submitted his plans for an apartment house to the New York City Department of Buildings (DOB) in July 1941; workers had started demolishing the Warburg residence. However, the developers' plans did not progress further, and the mansion reverted to Frieda.

Jewish Museum of New York

On January 14, 1944, Frieda Warburg donated the mansion to the Jewish Theological Seminary of America (JTS), commemorating what would have been Felix Warburg's 73rd birthday. She made the donation in memory of her husband, her father, and her brother Mortimer L. Schiff. Percival Goodman was hired to redesign the mansion, and the JTS filed plans with the DOB to convert the building into a museum in September 1944. The renovations were delayed by World War II and, in December 1945, the seminary's president Louis Finkelstein announced that work would start immediately. The first and second stories would each contain two exhibition rooms, while the third story would contain six exhibition rooms. The first story would contain the museum's lobby, and the music room on the second story would be turned into an auditorium. In January 1946, the Sheppard Pollack Company was hired to renovate the house for $100,000.

The JTS opened the Jewish Museum in the mansion in 1947. The museum held a preview of its first exhibit on May 6, 1947, displaying one thousand items on the Warburg House's first two stories. Two days later, the museum formally opened to the general public. Frieda Warburg said that, when she re-entered the house for the first time after its renovation, "I discovered to my joy that instead of depressing me, it gave me a wonderful feeling of happiness." The Jewish Museum opened a third exhibition on another story of the house in November 1947. In the two years after it relocated to the Warburg House, the museum had 175,000 visitors; this number had increased to 500,000 by 1952. Adam List designed a sculpture garden next to the museum, which was dedicated in 1959.

The Warburg House's former lawn was replaced with an annex in 1962. Officials laid the cornerstone for the  annex on May 20, 1962. The glass annex was designed by Samuel Glaser Associates and was named for philanthropist Albert A. List, who donated $500,000 toward the project. The Jewish Museum was temporarily closed for renovations at the end of that month. The project included installing elevators in the Warburg Mansion and a connection to the new annex. The Albert A. List Building opened in February 1963. The wing had  of space for exhibitions, workshops, and a store. Upon the completion of this wing, the Jewish Museum's main entrance was relocated to the List Building, and the ground-story windows of the Warburg Mansion were blacked out. During the 1960s, following the completion of the List Building, the Jewish Museum evolved into an exhibition space for modern art.

Preservation 
In 1970, the New York City Landmarks Preservation Commission (LPC) considered designating the Warburg House a city landmark, which the Jewish Museum successfully opposed. The JTS continued to own the building in the 1970s, even as the seminary discontinued its funding of the museum. By April 1981, however, the LPC was again debating whether to preserve the Warburg Mansion as a city landmark. At the time, the museum wished to replace the List Building with a 25-story tower containing both museum space and apartments, which would require modifications to the Warburg House. The JTS again opposed designation, arguing that it would prevent the museum from modifying the mansion without the LPC's permission and significantly increase the cost of maintenance. According to the Seminary, the museum had an annual deficit of $200,000, and it needed another $500,000 to perform structural repairs to the Warburg House.

Over 1,000 people signed a petition requesting the LPC grant landmark status to the Warburg Mansion. Manhattan Community Board 8, representing the surrounding neighborhood, voted in November 1981 to recommend that the LPC not designate the building as a landmark. Many local residents did not agree with this decision, and over 100 people wrote letters to the LPC supporting landmark protection. On November 24, 1981, the LPC designated the mansion as a city landmark; the designation excluded the List Building. The New York City Board of Estimate unanimously ratified the designation in April 1982, after the Jewish Museum submitted a modified plan for the tower, but the museum subsequently abandoned its plans for the tower project. The Warburg House was then added to the National Register of Historic Places on October 29, 1982.

Expansion 

Jewish Museum director Joan Rosenbaum and philanthropist Dorothy Rodgers announced in June 1985 that they planned to expand the museum. At the time, the Jewish Museum had a collection of 14,000 objects, but the Warburg Mansion and the List Building could only accommodate a few hundred objects simultaneously. The museum briefly considered opening a satellite location. These plans were abandoned by May 1988, when Rosenbaum announced that the museum had hired architect Kevin Roche to design a seven-story annex north of the original building at a projected cost of $17 million. The LPC endorsed plans for the annex, which was to be designed in an identical style to the original mansion. 

Construction began in November 1990 and lasted two and a half years. The Jewish Museum agreed to relocate to the New-York Historical Society building for the duration of the project, which ultimately cost $36 million. The annex was clad with limestone from the quarry that had supplied the original construction. The museum reopened on June 13, 1993.

The museum completed a renovation of its third-floor galleries in January 2018. The renovation, designed by the firm of Tsao & McKown, involved removing a staircase and unsealing some windows that faced Central Park.

Architecture

The Warburg House is located at 1109 Fifth Avenue, on the corner of Fifth Avenue and East 92nd Street in the Carnegie Hill neighborhood of the Upper East Side. As originally constructed by Gilbert, the house only used  of its Fifth Avenue frontage; the rest was used as a garden.

The house was designed and built with six floors and a basement in the Châteauesque style, a choice inspired by the Fletcher House (now Sinclair House) at 2 East 79th Street. As the Warburg House was being constructed, Jacob Schiff unsuccessfully tried to convince the Warburgs to build the house in a more classical style, as Schiff thought the Châteauesque style was overly ostentatious. The Warburgs' son Edward Warburg said his grandfather only slightly disapproved of the style, contrary to a popular rumor that held that Schiff thought the ornate design would inspire antisemitism.

Exterior 
The exteriors are clad with Indiana limestone. The building has had two façades since 1993, both of which are characterized by a profusion of windows with Gothic ornament. As built in 1908, the 92nd Street elevation of the façade was designed asymmetrically while the Fifth Avenue elevation was symmetrical. On both elevations, the first through fourth stories are clad in limestone. The fifth and sixth stories contain dormer windows that project from a steeply sloped mansard roof, which is clad with slate tiles. The fifth-story windows are surrounded by ornate limestone frames. Art historian E. Wayne Craven noted a similarity of the façade to the Hôtel de Cluny in Paris.

The house's main entrance is within a projecting frontispiece on 92nd Street, which contains a depressed elliptical arch at ground level, above which is a balcony with a balustrade. According to the Real Estate Record and Guide, a driveway led from 92nd Street to this frontispiece. From ground level to the top of the second floor, the center of the original Fifth Avenue elevation projects slightly, with balconies on the second and third floors. There are rectangular windows elsewhere on the ground floor, as well as a service entrance on 92nd Street. The fourth floor is recessed at the center and right of the 92nd Street façade. The roofline of the 92nd Street façade is also recessed at its center. The museum's annex, designed by Kevin Roche, imitates the original mansion's style.

Interior 
After entering from 92nd Street, visitors originally passed through a vestibule with an ornamental metal-and-glass screen and door. There was a grand pipe organ at the rear of the house. Adjacent to the organ, a staircase led to the upper floors. A dumbwaiter in the rear also connected the bedrooms upstairs with the main pantry and serving room downstairs. The fourth floor contained the bedrooms of Warburg's son and daughter, and a study was placed in the corner of that story, directly above the sitting room. The eastern end of the fourth story contained a nursery, as well as a bedroom for the child and nurse. On the fifth floor, there were guests' bedrooms with bathrooms on the western end, as well as a squash court, tea room, and shower with toilet on the eastern end. An electric elevator connected all stories between the basement and the sixth floor.

The Jewish Museum's annex, completed in 1993, contains an auditorium with architectural elements preserved from the mansion. These include a partition screen that was once installed near one of the mansion's staircases, as well as a dome made of stained glass. Other spaces in the annex include design elements, such as columns and moldings, which are similar to the design details in the original building. The annex also contains exhibition galleries, a bookstore, museum offices, and a reception hall. The upper stories contain more offices, as well as a library, study area, and meeting rooms. The furnishings were provided by Ralph Appelbaum Associates.

Critical reception 
In 1909, after the Warburg Mansion was completed, the Real Estate Record and Guide described the building as one of "a number of palatial residences" along Fifth Avenue. Christopher Gray wrote in 2004 that the mansion resembled the Isaac D. Fletcher House, "although it edges toward a simpler expression, with somewhat less detail". After the List Building was completed in 1963, one guidebook characterized the original mansion and the newer building as "a French chateau with a Miami Beach annex". Shortly after the List Building opened, architectural critic Ada Louise Huxtable wrote that the two structures had been "joined in a shotgun architectural marriage, but will never speak to each other architecturally". Huxtable subsequently wrote in 1979: "I only wish that the Warburg house didn't seem so unloved."

The 1993 addition, designed by Roche in imitation of Gilbert's style, had a mixed reception. When the plans for the annex were first announced, members of the Municipal Art Society expressed both satisfaction and displeasure over the new design. Some members praised it as a "modest and appropriate" addition complementing the original mansion, but others said the annex was "unimaginative and does nothing to show the evolution of design in our time". The completed work was favorably received by the general public. However, critics noted that while the annex was not distinguishable from the original building, it "lacked depth". Benjamin Forgey of The Washington Post wrote: "This pleasing if unexciting design is surprising mainly because of who did it," since Roche was better known as a modern architect.

References

Sources

External links 

Warburg, Felix
C. P. H. Gilbert buildings
Fifth Avenue
Houses on the National Register of Historic Places in Manhattan
Gothic Revival architecture in New York (state)
Houses in Manhattan
Upper East Side
Warburg family
Châteauesque architecture in the United States
New York City Designated Landmarks in Manhattan
1908 establishments in New York City
Gilded Age mansions